Unkel station is on the East Rhine Railway and is the only station in the town of Unkel in the German state of Rhineland-Palatinate. It was built in 1870. The station has three platform tracks on two platforms. The regional rail services are organised by the Verkehrsverbund Rhein-Mosel (Rhine-Moselle transport association, VRM) and the Verkehrsverbund Rhein-Sieg (Rhine-Sieg transport association, VRS). The station is classified  by Deutsche Bahn as a category 5 station.

History 

After the West Rhine Railway was completed in 1858, the Rhenish Railway Company (Rheinische Eisenbahn-Gesellschaft) began construction of the East Rhine line from Beuel to Neuwied. There was some discussion of the need for stations between Honnef and Linz. Erpel, Rheinbreitbach and Unkel each wanted its own station. The railway company originally did want to build a station. After protests from the mayor and the district administrator stations were built, first at Unkel and later at Erpel.

In the summer of 2006, the station building was closed after the station bar was abandoned. Weather-protected seating was built on the platform on the line to Koblenz as a replacement for the closed waiting room.

Services

The station is served by RE8 services hourly. On working days, it is also served by RB27 services, which together provide a service every half-hour to Cologne and Rommerskirchen and to Koblenz.

References

Railway stations in Rhineland-Palatinate
Railway stations in Germany opened in 1870
1870 establishments in Germany
Neuwied (district)